An internalizing disorder (or internalising disorder) is one type of emotional and behavioral disorder, along with externalizing disorders, and low incidence disorders. People who have an internalizing disorder will keep their problems to themselves, or internalize the problems.

Signs and symptoms 
Behaviors that are apparent in those with internalizing disorders include depression, withdrawal, anxiety, and loneliness. There are also behavioral characteristics involved with internalizing disorders. Some behavioral abnormalities include poor self-esteem, suicidal behaviors, decreased academic progress, and social withdrawal.  Internalizing one's problems, like sadness, can cause the problems to grow into larger burdens such as social withdrawal, suicidal behaviors or thoughts, and other unexplained physical symptoms.

DSM-5
The internalizing disorders, with high levels of negative affectivity, include depressive disorders, anxiety disorders, obsessive-compulsive and related disorders, trauma and stressor-related disorders, and dissociative disorders,  bulimia, and anorexia come under this category,  as do dysthymia, and somatic disorders (in Huberty 2017) and posttraumatic stress disorder (in Huberty 2004).

Treatment 
Some treatments for internalizing disorders include antidepressants, electroconvulsive therapy, and psychotherapy.

See also 
Deceit
 Eating Disorders
Illegal drug abuse
 Obsessive-compulsive disorders

References

Source

 - Huberty 2004, 2017

External links 
 Depression at National Institute of Mental Health website

Types of mental disorders